Across the Borders, a live album by Battlefield Band, was released in 1997 on the Temple Records label. The total running time is 66:10.

Track listing
 "Miss Sarah Macmanus/Appropriate Dipstick/Cape Breton Fiddlers' Welcome" – 4:06
 "Tramps and Hawkers" – 6:09
 "Snow on the Hills/Xesus & Felisa" – 4:30
 "The Concert Reel/The Green Mountain", with Eric Rigler – 2:24
 "The Arran Convict", with Seamus Tansey – 4:40
 "My Home Town/Kalabakan", with Eric Rigler – 3:40
 "Tuireadh Iain Ruaidh", with Alison Kinnaird – 4:54
 "The Trimdon Grange Explosion" – 4:09
 "Simon Thoumire's Jig/Shake a Leg/Ríl Gan Ainm" – 4:05
 "Miss Kate Rusby", with Eric Rigler – 4:26
 "The Green and the Blue", with Eric Rigler and Kate Rusby – 5:25
 "The Donnie MacGregor/Clumsy Lover" – 3:05
 "Woe Be Gone/Bubba's Reel/Frank's Reel", with Alison Kinnaird – 6:41
 "Six Days on the Road", with The Radio Sweethearts – 4:15
 "In and Out the Harbour/The Top Tier/Sleepy Maggie/Molly Rankin" – 3:41

Personnel

Battlefield Band
Alan Reid
Iain MacDonald
Alistair Russel
John McCusker

Guests
Alison Kinnaird
Kate Rusby
Seamus Tansey
Eric Rigler
The Radio Sweethearts

Sources and links
 

Battlefield Band albums
1997 albums